Eddy Pauwels (2 May 1935 – 6 March 2017) was a Belgian racing cyclist from 1958 to 1966. He won 4 stages in the Tour de France and wore the yellow jersey for 4 days in total. In 1962, Pauwels won the combativity award in the Tour de France. He died on 6 March 2017 at the age of 81.

Major results

1958
 6th Overall Critérium du Dauphiné Libéré
1959
 4th Overall Tour of Belgium
1st Stage 3
1960
 1st  Overall Trois Jours d'Anvers
1961
 4th Overall Tour of Belgium
 5th Scheldeprijs
 9th Overall Tour de France
1st Stages 14 & 17
1962
 9th Overall Vuelta a España
 10th Overall Tour de France
1st Stage 11
1963
 Tour de France
Held  after Stages 1–2
1st Stage 1
 4th Grote Prijs Jef Scherens
 6th Rund um den Henninger Turm
1964
 4th Overall Tour de Romandie

References

External links
 

1935 births
2017 deaths
Belgian male cyclists
Belgian Tour de France stage winners
People from Bornem
Cyclists from Antwerp Province
20th-century Belgian people